Light Makes A Way is the second EP by Remedy Drive, released on May 2, 2011 in digital-only format and is the first release to feature Remedy Drive's new line up following the departure of the 3 of the band's 4 founding brothers.

Track listing
Light Makes A Way -3:20
Hold On -3:36
Don't Wait Too Long -3:23
Follow Me -3:46
Disappear -4:41

Credits
David Zach – lead vocals, keyboard, rhythm guitar
Dave Mohr - Lead Guitar, Backing Vocals
Corey Horn - Bass, Backing Vocals
Timmy Jones - Drums

External links
EP Review at JesusFreak Hideout
EP at Remedy Drive webstore

2011 EPs
Remedy Drive albums